Wetteren is a municipality located in the Belgian province of East Flanders. In 2021, Wetteren had a total population of 26,206. The total area is 36.68 km².

Educational institutions 
 Gemeenschapsonderwijs  Noordlaan 10, Wetteren
 Basischool Scheppers  Cooppallaan 82, Wetteren
 Basisschool Sint-Gertrudis  F. Leirensstraat 31, Wetteren
 Basisschool Sint-Jozef  Wegvoeringstraat 59 a, Wetteren
 Scheppersinstituut  Cooppaallaan 128, Wetteren
 Sint-Gertrudiscollege  Wegvoeringstraat 21, Wetteren
 Sint-Jozefinstituut  Wegvoeringstraat 59 a, Wetteren
 Mariagaard  Oosterzelsesteenweg 80, Wetteren

Notable people
 Julien De Wilde (b. Wetteren, 7 January 1967), businessman
 Émile Pierre Joseph Storms (1846-1918) Explorer of Congo Free State, General
 Cecile Bombeek, serial killer
 Ben Mertens, snooker player

References

External links
 
 Official website 
 Chiro Overschelde Wetteren Liefkenshoek 24, Wetteren
 Scouts & Gidsen Vlaanderen Wetteren (St.-Jan) Groenstraat 33, Wetteren
 Scouts & Gidsen Vlaanderen Wetteren (Prins Boudewijn) Groene Wegel, Wetteren
 Chess Club De Wetterse Vrijpion Warandelaan 14, Wetteren

Municipalities of East Flanders
Populated places in East Flanders